Guts is a 2019 American graphic novel written and illustrated by Raina Telgemeier and colored by Braden Lamb. The book received positive reviews from critics, who praised Telgemeier's normalization of mental health problems. The book also received two Eisner Awards.

Background

As with the 2 other books in the Smile series, Guts is an autobiographical novel detailing events of Telgemeier's life. In an interview with Reading Rockets, Telgemeier explains that originally, she did not want to write about her stomach problems as she thought it would be too "gross" and "disgusting". However, she later realized that the more open she was, "the better". Guts was written and illustrated in about 2 years.

Reception

Guts received positive reception. Scott Stossel from The New York Times said "'Guts' is dedicated to 'anyone who feels afraid.' For anyone that includes, this book’s warmth, humanity and humor provides a balm more soul-soothing than any pill." Karen Jensen from Teen Librarian Toolbox said "Far too many of our young people are wrestling with mental health issues and we need to do better for them. Guts is just one of the ways that we can help. And that’s the power of story." Kirkus Reviews said: "With young readers diagnosed with anxiety in ever increasing numbers, this book offers a necessary mirror to many."

Awards

See also

References 

American children's books
2019 children's books